Christopher Rosser, better known by his stage name Quay Global, is an American record producer. He is best known for his works with rapper Lil Baby. His works can be identified by the producer tag "Cook that shit up, Quay!".

Early life 
Rosser started producing beats when he was nine years old. He went to Columbia High School.

Career 
Rosser made a name for himself by producing the track "My Dawg" by Lil Baby, which charted on the Billboard Hot 100 and was certified Platinum by the RIAA. After "My Dawg" saw success, N'Quay was signed by Atlanta-based record label Quality Control Music in October 2017. Other hit songs that Rosser has produced by Lil Baby are "Life Goes On", "Pure Cocaine", and "Woah", all of which charted on the Hot 100, the latter of which peaked at number 15.

Production discography

Charted singles

Other charted songs

References 

Living people
Year of birth missing (living people)
African-American record producers
Record producers from Georgia (U.S. state)